Sulu, officially the Province of Sulu (Tausūg: Wilāya sin Lupa' Sūg), is a province of the Philippines in the Sulu Archipelago and part of the Bangsamoro Autonomous Region in Muslim Mindanao (BARMM).

Its capital is Jolo on the island of the same name. Maimbung, the royal capital of the Sultanate of Sulu, is also located in the province. Sulu is along the southern border of the Sulu Sea and the northern boundary of the Celebes Sea.

Out of all 82 provinces in the Philippines, it is the poorest, as evidenced by it having the highest poverty rate.

History

Pre-Spanish and Spanish eras

Prior to the arrival of Islam in Sulu, the province used to adhere to local animist religions; this later changed to Hindu and Buddhist belief systems. Throughout this time, the Kingdom of Lupah Sug had been established centuries before Islam arrived.

The advent of Islam around 1138 through merchants and traders had a distinct influence on Southeast Asia. The coming of Arabs, Persians and other Muslims paved the way for the arrival of religious missionaries, traders, scholars and travelers to Sulu and Mindanao in the 12th century.

A landmark born of the social process was the founding of the Sultanate of Sulu. Year 1380 CE, Karim-ul Makhdum came to Sulu and introduced Islam to the Philippines. In 1450 CE, Johore-born Arab adventurer Sayyid Abubakar Abirin came to Sulu and lived with Rajah Baguinda Ali. Sayyid Abubakar eventually married Ali's daughter, Dayang-dayang Paramisuli, and inherited Rajah Baguinda's polity (which was a principality before), which he turned into the Sultanate of Sulu and become its first Sultan. To consolidate his rule, Sayyid Abubakar united the local political units under the umbrella of the Sultanate. He brought Sulu, Zamboanga Peninsula, Palawan, and Basilan under its aegis.

The navigational error that landed Ferdinand Magellan in Limasawa brought awareness of Europe to the Philippines and opened the door to Spanish colonial incursion. The Spaniards introduced Christianity and a political system of church-state dichotomy, which encountered fierce resistance in the devastating Moro wars from 1578 to 1899. The Sultanate of Sulu formally recognised Spanish sovereignty in Tawi-Tawi and Sulu in middle of 19th century, but these areas remained partially ruled by the Spanish as their sovereignty was limited to military stations, garrisons, and pockets of civilian settlements, until they had to abandon the region as a consequence of their defeat in the Spanish–American War.

American and Japanese eras

After Spain ceded the Philippines to the United States, American forces came to Jolo and ended the 23 years of Spanish military occupation (1876 to 1899). On August 20, Sultan Jamalul Kiram II and Brig. Gen. John C. Bates signed the Bates Agreement that continued the gradual emasculation of the Sultanate started by Spain (Treaty of 1878) until March 1915 when the Sultan abdicated his temporal powers in the Carpenter Agreement. The Agreement eliminated opposition to the civilian government of Gov. Clinton Solidum.

The Department of Mindanao and Sulu under Gov. Carpenter was created by Philippine Commission Act 2309 (1914) and ended on February 5, 1920, by Act of Philippine Legislature No. 2878. The Bureau of Non-Christian Tribes was organized and briefly headed by Teofisto Guingona Sr. With the enactment by the US Congress of the Jones Law (Philippine Autonomy Law) in 1916, ultimate Philippine independence was guaranteed and the Filipinization of public administration began. Sulu, however, had an appointed American governor until 1935, and the Governor General in Manila had a say in Sulu affairs.

At any rate, the essence of local governance forged by Rajah Baguinda continued to permeate the ethos of Sulu politics despite centuries of colonial presence. History points to a local government in Sulu that antedates other similar systems in the country.

The province hosted the Daru Jambangan (Palace of Flowers) which was the royal palace of the Sultan of Sulu since historical times. The palace, located in Maimbung was made of wood, and was destroyed in 1932 by a huge storm.

During the brief Japanese occupation years, Sulu was bombed by the Japanese and was conquered afterwards. The Japanese were eventually expelled by the Americans and the natives of Sulu, and the Americans started to push for the independence of the Philippines as 'one country'. This prompted various leaders from Mindanao and the Sulu archipelago to campaign against being lumped with the Catholic natives of Luzon and the Visayas. Despite the campaign against the 'one Philippines model', the United States granted independence to the Philippines, effectively giving control of Mindanao and the Sulu archipelago to the Filipino government in Manila.

Postwar era
At the beginning of Philippine independence era, the reconstruction of the Daru Jambangan continued to be of huge importance to the people of Sulu as only a few arches and posts remain from the once grand palace complex. Many members of the royal family advocated for the reconstruction of the palace, however, the government of the Philippines made no official position or fund for the matter. During that time, the Mindanao sentiment to become a free country on its own was also felt in Sulu.

In 1948, Hadji Kamlon, a World War II veteran, started an uprising on Luuk, Sulu. He surrendered in 1949 but started another uprising in 1952. He then surrendered on 31 July 1952 to Secretary of Defense Ramon Magsaysay. However, he started a third uprising a week later. He surrendered again on 9 November 1952 but would start another uprising in early 1953. He would then surrender on 11 August 1953 after an encounter with Philippines Government troops. He violated the terms of his surrender a week later. Two years later, on 24 September 1955, he would then surrender after an encounter with government troops in Tandu Panuan, Luuk.

In 1973, the municipalities of South Ubian, Tandubas, Simunul, Sitangkai, Balimbing (Panglima Sugala), Bungao, Cagayan de Sulu (Mapun), and Turtle Island were transferred from the jurisdiction of Sulu to the newly formed province of Tawi-Tawi pursuant to Presidential Decree No. 302 of September 11, 1973.

The Marcos Administration
During Marcos era, Sulu was one of the provinces that fought back against Ferdinand Marcos as his regime tortured, killed, and exterminated hundreds of Moros. When news broke out regarding the planned invasion of eastern Sabah, Marcos ordered the military to massacre Tausug warriors, which led to the brutal 1968 Jabidah massacre, the worst human rights violation against the natives of Sulu.

News about the Jabidah Massacre led to the rise of numerous separatist movements in Mindanao, including Sulu, eventually leading to groups engaging in armed conflict with the Philippine government. One of the most destructive clashes, the 1974 Battle of Jolo, was so destructive that it was estimated to have rendered 40,000 people homeless in Jolo, the capital of Sulu.

The Sultan of Sulu, members of the royal family, and the leaders of Sulu were in favor of the People Power Revolution in Manila that successfully toppled the dictatorship and restored democracy in the country.

Autonomy and recent history
In 1989, the province of Sulu became part of the Autonomous Region in Muslim Mindanao or ARMM. A peace pact between the Moro National Liberation Front or MNLF and the Philippine government was also made. The founder and leader of the MNLF, Nur Misuari, who was a native of Sulu and adhered to the Sultanate of Sulu, became the governor of the entire ARMM from 1996 to 2001.

In 2016, a small replica of Daru Jambangan was built in the neighboring town of Talipao and became a centerpiece for a 'vacation park'. The replica was about 25% of the actual size of the real Daru Jambangan during its heyday. A campaign to restore the Daru Jambangan in its original location in Maimbung is still ongoing. The National Commission for Culture and the Arts and the National Museum of the Philippines were tasked to faithfully restore or reconstruct the Daru Jambangan in Maimbung.

In 2019, the Bangsamoro autonomy plebiscite led to the ratification of the Bangsamoro Organic Law (BOL) creating the Bangsamoro Autonomous Region in Muslim Mindanao (BARMM) to replace the ARMM. The initiative lost by a 54.3% margin in Sulu, but was carried nonetheless because the votes of the entire ARMM were counted as one. (Several other localities in Mindanao which had not originally been part of the ARMM also ratified the BOL and were thus added to the BARMM.)

Geography

Sulu is a part of the Sulu Archipelago, which stretches from the tip of the Zamboanga Peninsula on the north to the island of Borneo in the south. The main island and its islets are situated between the island-provinces of Basilan to the northeast, and Tawi-Tawi to the southwest. Sulu is bordered by two seas; the Sulu Sea to the north, and the Celebes Sea to its south. Sulu has over 157 islets, some of which remain unnamed.

The islands are organized into four groups:
 Jolo group
 Pangutaran group
 Tongkil-Banguingui (Samales) group
 Siasi-Tapul group

Administrative divisions
Sulu comprises 19 municipalities that are organized into two legislative districts and further subdivided into 410 barangays.

Demographics

Although consisting of a mixed community of Muslims, the Tausugs dominate the Sulu Archipelago. The Tausug were among the first inhabitants of the Philippines to embrace Islam as a religion and a way of life. They are referred to as ‘people of the current’, reflective of their close ties to the sea.

Religion

Sulu inhabitants are predominantly Muslim, constituting about 99% of the provincial population in 2015.

A majority of Sulu's Muslim population practice Sunni Islam of the Shafi'i tradition, as taught by Arab, Persian, Indian Muslim, Chinese Muslim and Malaccan missionaries from the 14th Century onwards.

Relatively newer Islamic sects, mostly brought by returning veterans of the Afghan wars and missionaries from Pakistan's stricter Sufi traditions, referred to as the Tableegh, have been active in propagating what they believe to be a "purer" Islamic way of life and worship. A very small number who have since married into Iranian or Iraqi families have converted to Shiite Islam.

The majority of Sulu Christians are Catholics. They are under the jurisdiction of Archdiocese of Zamboanga through its suffragan Apostolic Vicariate of Jolo. Non-Catholic Christians include Evangelicals, Jesus Miracle Crusade, Episcopalian, Iglesia ni Cristo (INC), Mormons, Seventh-day Adventists, Jehovah's Witnesses, and a number of other Protestant denominations. Only the most recent Chinese immigrants adhere to Buddhism or Taoism, while most of the older Chinese families have acculturated and have either converted to Christianity or Islam while retaining many of their Chinese beliefs.

Languages
The Tausug language is the lingua franca of Sulu. The other local language is the indigenous Sama, which is widely used in varied tones and accents. This variety led to the development of Sinama dialects. The major ones are Sinama Sibutu (spoken mainly in the Sibutu-Sitangkai Region), Sinama Simunul (concentrated in Simunul-Manuk-Mangkaw Islands), Sinama Kapoan (spoken in the South Ubian-Tandubas and Sapa-Sapa Regions) and Sinama Banguingui (concentrated in Buan Island and spoken by Banguingui people).

The Bajau-Sama language is also spoken, as are the official languages of Tagalog (Filipino) and English. Many locals and barter traders can speak Sabah Malay, while Chavacano is also spoken by Christian and Muslim locals who maintain contacts and trade with the mainland Zamboanga Peninsula and Basilan. Many Muslims can also speak Cebuano because of the mass influx of Cebuano settlers to Mindanao, especially among the Tau Sūg since Tausug is a related Visayan language.

Government
Governors after People Power Revolution 1986:

Vice Governors after People Power Revolution 1986:

Economy

Sulu is predominantly agricultural with farming and fishing as its main livelihood activities. Its fertile soil and ideal climate can grow a variety of crops such as abaca, coconuts, Sulu coffee, oranges, and lanzones as well as exotic fruits seldom found elsewhere in the country such as durian and mangosteen.

Fishing is the most important industry since the Sulu Sea is one of the richest fishing grounds in the country. The province also has an extensive pearl industry, with a pearl farm on Marungas Island. The backs of sea turtles are made into beautiful trays and combs. During breaks from fishing, the people build boats and weave mats. Other industries include coffee processing and fruit preservation.

The handicrafts of Sulu have both Islamic and Malay influences. Skilled artisans make boats, bladed weapons, bronze and brassware, pis cloth, embroidered textiles, shellcraft, traditional house carvings, and carved wooden grave markers.

The province used to be one of the most prosperous in the southern Philippines. However, due to conflicts, terrorism, and the establishment of jihadists groups such as the Abu Sayyaf, the province's economy has suffered badly and has been reduced to its current state.

Transportation
After the success of new flight of Philippine Airlines inside Bangsamoro region, the government is already looking forward to open the route to Cotabato City. As of to date Gove
Leading Edge, Cebu Pacific Cebgo and Platinum Skies from  Zamboanga are existing operational flight utilizing the newly renovated Jolo Airport.

Notable people
Hadji Butu – Filipino statesman, first Muslim member of the Senate of the Philippines.
Santanina Tillah Rasul – Filipina politician and the first Muslim woman member of the Senate of the Philippines.
Antonio Kho Jr. – 193rd Associate Justice of the Supreme Court of the Philippines
Abdulmari Imao – National Artist of the Philippines for Visual Arts – Sculpture
Leonor Orosa-Goquingco – National Artist of the Philippines for Dance
Samuel K. Tan – historian and former chairperson of National Historical Commission of the Philippines
Kerima Polotan Tuvera – fiction writer, essayist, and journalist
Mohammed Esmail Kiram I – Sultan of Sulu from 1950 to 1974
 Princess Tarhata Kiram – Moro leader
Mohammed Mahakuttah Abdullah Kiram – last Sultan of Sulu officially recognized by Philippine government
Jamalul Kiram III – self-proclaimed Sultan of Sulu 
Nur Misuari - leader of the Moro National Liberation Front
Muedzul Lail Tan Kiram – crown prince of Sultan Mahakuttah Kiram and current head of the Royal house of Sulu
Tuburan Tamse – swimmer and the first Muslim Filipino Olympian

See also
 Bangsamoro
 Moro people
 Islam in the Philippines
 Moro Islamic Liberation Front
 Sultanate of Sulu
 Moro National Liberation Front
 Battle of Jolo (1974)

References

External links

 
 
 Philippine Standard Geographic Code
 Local Governance Performance Management System

 
Provinces of the Philippines
Provinces of Bangsamoro
Sulu Archipelago
Sulu Sea
States and territories established in 1914
1914 establishments in the Philippines
Island provinces of the Philippines